Ibrahim Tankary (born 24 March 1972) is a Nigerien football striker. He currently plays for Rusas Foot.

Career 
Tankary arrived at Zulte-Waregem in the summer of 2004 from FC Brussels.  He had previously played for Sint-Truidense in the Jupiler League (on loan from Zulte-Waregem) and Lommel, a now defunct club replaced by KVSK United. He left in August 2008 K. Londerzeel S.K. and signed for Rusas Foot.

International 
Tankary played for Niger, but also holds a Belgian nationality.

References

External links
 

1972 births
Living people
Nigerien footballers
Niger international footballers
Association football forwards
R.W.D.M. Brussels F.C. players
S.V. Zulte Waregem players
Sint-Truidense V.V. players
Royale Union Saint-Gilloise players
K.F.C. Lommel S.K. players